The Battle of South Guangxi was one of the 22 major engagements between the National Revolutionary Army and Imperial Japanese Army during the Second Sino-Japanese War.

In November 1939, the Japanese landed on the coast of Guangxi and captured Nanning. In this battle, the Japanese successfully cut off Chongqing from the ocean, effectively severing foreign aid to China's war efforts by the sea, rendering Indochina, the Burma Road and The Hump the only ways to send aid to China.

The Chinese launched several major offensives that maximized Japanese casualties. A majority of the conflicts occurred in the fighting for Kunlun Pass. With the success of the Vietnam Expedition in September 1940, the Japanese were able to cut China off from Indochina. Now only the Burma Road and The Hump remained, ending the costly necessity of occupying Guangxi. By November 1940, Japanese forces had evacuated from Guangxi except from some coastal enclaves.

Order of battle

See also
 Air Warfare of WWII from the Sino-Japanese War perspective

Sources
 
 Map 18
  Perry–Castañeda Library Map Collection, China 1:250,000, Series L500, U.S. Army Map Service, 1954- . Topographic Maps of China during the Second World War.
 These two maps cover the area where most of the fighting went on in the Guangxi campaign:
 Lai-Pin nf49-1, has the Kunlun Pass just above where the road from Nanning enters the map:  
 Nanning nf49-5

References

Bibliography

 Cheung, Raymond. OSPREY AIRCRAFT OF THE ACES 126: Aces of the Republic of China Air Force. Oxford: Bloomsbury Publishing Plc, 2015. .
 Xú,Lùméi. Fallen: A Decryption of 682 Air Force Heroes of The War of Resistance-WWII and Their Martyrdom. 东城区, 北京， 中国: 团结出版社, 2016. .

South Guangxi
South Guangxi
1939 in China
1939 in Japan
1940 in Japan
1940 in China
South Guangxi 1939
Military history of Guangxi